The BT Centre for Major Programme Management was an interdisciplinary research and center at University of Oxford on management of major programs, which are commonly also called "megaprojects". The Centre was located at Saïd Business School.

Research
The Centre's research agenda focused on a broad and deep understanding of major programmes in a variety of areas such as construction megaprojects, sporting events, IT projects, and major science programmes.

Notes 

Departments of the University of Oxford